798 Naval Air Squadron (798 NAS) was a Naval Air Squadron of the Royal Navy's Fleet Air Arm.

Notes

References 

700 series Fleet Air Arm squadrons
Air squadrons of the Royal Navy in World War II
Military units and formations established in 1943
Military units and formations disestablished in 1946
1943 establishments in the United Kingdom
1946 disestablishments in the United Kingdom